Takydromus kuehnei is a species of lizard in the family Lacertidae. It is found in China, Taiwan, and Vietnam.

References

Takydromus
Lizards of Asia
Reptiles of China
Reptiles of Taiwan
Reptiles of Vietnam
Reptiles described in 1909
Taxa named by John Van Denburgh